Medianeira is a municipality in the state of Paraná in Brazil. In 2020 it had 46,574 inhabitants. The agriculture-industrial sector is the base of the city's economy.

References

External links
 City website 

Medianeira